In the 1990–91 season Panathinaikos played for 32nd consecutive time in Greece's top division, the Alpha Ethniki. They also competed in the European Cup and the Greek Cup.

Squad

Competitions

Alpha Ethniki

Classification

Greek Cup

Final

European Cup

First round

References

External links
 Panathinaikos FC official website

Panathinaikos F.C. seasons
Panathinaikos
Greek football championship-winning seasons